
Year 357 BC was a year of the pre-Julian Roman calendar. At the time, it was known as the Year of the Consulship of Rutilus and Imperiosus (or, less frequently, year 397 Ab urbe condita). The denomination 357 BC for this year has been used since the early medieval period, when the Anno Domini calendar era became the prevalent method in Europe for naming years.

Events 
 By place 

 Persian Empire 
 Rhodes falls to the Persian satrap Mausolus of Halicarnassus.

See Purim

 Thrace 
 The Athenian general and mercenary commander, Chares and the Euboean mercenary Charidemus regain the Thracian Chersonese for Athens from the Thracian king Cersobleptes. Charidemus receives, from Athens, a golden crown for his part in the victory.

 Macedonia 
 The Macedonian general, Parmenion, wins a great victory over the Illyrians. King Philip II of Macedon, having disposed of an Illyrian threat, occupies the Athenian city of Amphipolis (which commands the gold mines of Mount Pangaion). Philip II now has control of the strategic city which secures the eastern frontier of Macedonia and gives him access into Thrace.
 Philip II of Macedon marries Olympias, the Molossian princess of Epirus thus helping to stabilize Macedonia's western frontier.

 Sicily 
 The brother-in-law of Dionysius I, Dion, exiled from Syracuse in 366 BC by Dionysius II, assembles a force of 1,500 mercenaries at Zacynthus and sails to Sicily. Dion wrests power from the weak Dionysius II, who is exiled and flees to Locri.

Rome 

Gaius Marcius Rutilus elected Consul

Births

Deaths 
 Chabrias, Athenian general

References